Larisa Savchenko and Natasha Zvereva defeated the defending champion Jana Novotná and her partner Gigi Fernández in the final, 6–4, 3–6, 8–6 to win the ladies' doubles tennis title at the 1991 Wimbledon Championships.

Novotná and Helena Suková were the defending champions, but did not play together. Suková partnered Arantxa Sánchez Vicario, but lost in the quarterfinals to Martina Navratilova and Pam Shriver.

Seeds

  Gigi Fernández /  Jana Novotná (final)
  Larisa Savchenko /  Natasha Zvereva (champions)
  Arantxa Sánchez Vicario /  Helena Suková (quarterfinals)
  Mary Joe Fernández /  Zina Garrison (semifinals)
  Kathy Jordan /  Lori McNeil (quarterfinals)
  Nicole Provis /  Elizabeth Smylie (third round)
  Gretchen Magers /  Robin White (quarterfinals)
  Martina Navratilova /  Pam Shriver (semifinals)
  Elise Burgin /  Patty Fendick (first round)
  Katrina Adams /  Manon Bollegraf (quarterfinals)
  Jennifer Capriati /  Mercedes Paz (third round)
  Jill Hetherington /  Kathy Rinaldi (third round)
  Claudia Kohde-Kilsch /  Elna Reinach (third round)
  Nathalie Tauziat /  Judith Wiesner (third round)
  Rosalyn Fairbank-Nideffer /  Brenda Schultz (second round)
  Lise Gregory /  Alysia May (second round)

Qualifying

Draw

Finals

Top half

Section 1

Section 2

Bottom half

Section 3

Section 4

References

External links

1991 Wimbledon Championships – Women's draws and results at the International Tennis Federation

Women's Doubles
Wimbledon Championship by year – Women's doubles
Wimbledon Championships